Charles Michael "Mickey" Harrington (October 8, 1934 – September 20, 2017) was an American professional baseball player who appeared in one game in Major League Baseball (MLB) for the Philadelphia Phillies. Born in Hattiesburg, he attended the University of Southern Mississippi.

Although Harrington played in only one MLB game, as a pinch-runner, his professional career spanned 1957–1966 as an outfielder, first baseman and third baseman in minor league action. After signing with the Phillies' organization, he was recalled from Triple-A in the midst of his seventh pro season.

His MLB appearance came on July 10, 1963, at Connie Mack Stadium, when he was called upon to pinch run following first baseman Roy Sievers' single; it was the eighth inning and the Phils led the San Francisco Giants, 10–2. Harrington advanced to second base one out later, following Don Hoak's single. But the inning ended when Clay Dalrymple grounded into a double play. Harrington did not stay in the game on defense, as veteran Frank Torre took Sievers' post at first base in the ninth.

Harrington died on September 20, 2017, in Hattiesburg, Mississippi.

References

External links

1934 births
2017 deaths
Arkansas Travelers players
Baseball players from Mississippi
Buffalo Bisons (minor league) players
Columbus Jets players
Dallas Rangers players
Hawaii Islanders players
Indianapolis Indians players
Miami Marlins (IL) players
Moultrie/Brunswick Phillies players
Philadelphia Phillies players
Richmond Virginians (minor league) players
Southern Miss Golden Eagles baseball players
Sportspeople from Hattiesburg, Mississippi
Syracuse Chiefs players
Toledo Mud Hens players
Tulsa Oilers (baseball) players